Fauna of Sudan and South Sudan include:

 Aardvark
 Aardwolf
 African buffalo
 African bush elephant
 African civet
 African golden wolf
 African leopard
 Ball python
 Banded mongoose
 Barbary sheep
 Black-backed jackal
 Blue duiker
 Bohor reedbuck
 Bongo
 Bushbuck
 Cape hyrax
 Common duiker
 Common genet
 Congo lion
 Dama gazelle
 Dorcas gazelle
 Dugong
 Gemsbok
 Giant eland
 Giant forest hog
 Grant's gazelle
 Grant's zebra
 Greater kudu
 Grevy's zebra
 Hartebeest
 Hippopotamus
 Klipspringer
 Kob
 Lion
 Maneless zebra
 Marsh mongoose
 Nile lechwe
 North African ostrich
 Northern white rhinoceros
 Nubian giraffe
 Nubian wild ass
 Okapi
 Oribi
 Pale fox
 Plains zebra
 Red fox
 Red river hog
 Roan antelope
 Rothschild's giraffe
 Rueppell's fox
 Side-striped jackal
 Sitatunga
 Somali wild ass
 Somali wild dog
 Spotted hyena
 Striped hyena
 Sudan cheetah
 Temminck's pangolin
 Thomson's gazelle
 Warthog
 Waterbuck
 Yellow-backed duiker